Vandre may refer to:
 Bandra, a suburb in Mumbai, India
 Vandre (Vidhan Sabha constituency)
 Vandre East (Vidhan Sabha constituency)
 Vandre West (Vidhan Sabha constituency)
 Vandre, Bhiwandi, a village in Thane district of India

See also 
 Vandré (disambiguation)